Bertha Behrens (7 September 1848, Thale – 9 September 1912) was a German novelist, who used the pen name W. Heimburg (AKA Wilhelmine Heimburg).  She completed Das Eulenhaus, a posthumous novel by Marlitt in the Gartenlaube, in which periodical most of her novels appeared. She is the daughter of Charlotte Birch-Pfeiffer, a German actress and dramatist. The following is a list of some of her works:  
 Aus dem Leben meiner alten Freudin (1879; twelfth edition, 1908)  
 Lumpenmüllers Lieschen (1879)  
 Ihr einziger Bruder (1882; fifteenth edition, 1909)
 Waldblumen (1882; sixth edition, 1894)
 Trudchens Heirat (1884)
 Dazumal, eight stories (1887)
 Um fremde Schuld (1895)
 Antons Erben (1898)
 Sette Oldenroths Liebe (1902)
 Gesammelte Romane und Novellen (ten volumes, Leipzig, 1894–97)
 Dr. Danz und seine Frau (1903)
 Wie auch wir vergeben (1907)
 Ueber steinige Wege (1908)
 Der Stärkere (1909)
 Familie Lorenz (1910)

References

External links
 
 

1848 births
1912 deaths
People from Thale
People from the Province of Saxony
German women novelists
Writers from Saxony-Anhalt
19th-century German writers
19th-century German women writers